Sherwood School District is a small school district that serves Sherwood, Oregon, United States. The administrative offices are at 23295 Southwest Main Street in Sherwood.

The district currently has four elementary schools, one middle school, and one high school. They include Archer Glen Elementary School, Hawks' View Elementary School, Middleton Elementary School, Edy Ridge Elementary School, Sherwood Middle School, and Sherwood High School. The Sherwood Elementary School District 88J was established in about 1891, with other elementary districts later merged into the district. The high school district (9J) and elementary districts later consolidated to form a unified school district. Heather H. Cordie has been the district superintendent since 2010.

Demographics
In the 2009 school year, the district had 35 students classified as homeless by the Department of Education, or 0.8% of students in the district.

2016 Capital Bond 
The Sherwood Schools 2016 Capital Bond is a plan to generally improve various schools throughout the district, as well as construct a new High School, which will replace the existing Sherwood High School as of the 2020-21 School Year. Laurel Ridge will be converted into Two Elementary Schools (Currently Joined Middle and Elementary School). In addition, various buildings will be modified or moved to accommodate the district's increasing size.

References

External links
Sherwood School District Homepage

School districts in Oregon
Sherwood, Oregon
Education in Washington County, Oregon
1891 establishments in Oregon